USNS Victorious (T-AGOS-19) is a Victorious-class ocean surveillance ship which was acquired by the U.S. Navy in 1991 and assigned to the Military Sealift Command (MSC) Special Missions Program.

Built in Morgan City, Louisiana
Victorious was built by McDermott Shipyards, Morgan City, Louisiana. She was laid down on 12 April 1988 and launched on 3 May 1988 and was delivered to the U.S. Navy on 13 August 1991.

Special program
Victorious was crewed by 19 civilian mariners under the control of the Military Sealift Command (MSC) and staffed with five sponsors.

She is of a small waterplane area twin hull (SWATH) design, similar to a catamaran, which provides a stable platform for towing the ship's SURTASS sonar arrays.

Incidents with China 

On March 4, 2009, Victorious was involved in one of a string of incidents between US research ships and Chinese ships. While operating in international waters, roughly 120 miles off the coast of mainland China in the Yellow Sea, a Chinese Bureau of Fisheries Patrol vessel used a high-intensity spotlight to illuminate the entire length of Victorious several times.

In May 2009, Victorious was again harassed by Chinese ships, this time while operating in the Yellow Sea.  The Chinese vessels repeatedly approached Victorious at as close as 30 yards in heavy fog, at one point stopping in its path, forcing Victorious to stop to avoid a collision.

See also
 United States Navy
 USNS Impeccable (T-AGOS-23)

Notes

References

 NavSource Online: Service Ship Photo Archive - T-AGOS-19 Victorious
 

1988 ships
Ships built in Morgan City, Louisiana
Small waterplane area twin hull vessels
Victorious-class ocean surveillance ships
Military catamarans